Iugani may refer to several villages in Romania:

 Iugani, a village in Mircești Commune, Iaşi County
 Iugani, a village in Boghești Commune, Vrancea County